Surcossus perlaris is a moth in the family Cossidae, and the only species in the genus Surcossus. It was described by Heimlich in 1960 and is found in Chile.

References

Natural History Museum Lepidoptera generic names catalog

Moths described in 1960
Cossinae
Endemic fauna of Chile